WS, Ws, or ws may refer to:

Businesses and organizations
 Ware Shoals Railroad (reporting mark WS)
 WestJet (IATA airline code WS)
 Society of Writers to Her Majesty's Signet, in post-nomial abbreviation
 Williams Street, the production arm for Cartoon Network’s nighttime programming block, Adult Swim.
 Warm Showers, a non-profit hospitality exchange network for world cyclists.
 Williams-Sonoma, Inc., American kitchenware and home furnishings retailer.

Places
 WS postcode area, West Midlands, UK
 Samoa (ISO 3166-1 country code WS)
 Winschoten railway station, the Netherlandsm station code

Science and technology
 .ws, the Internet country code top-level domain for Samoa
 ws:// WebSocket protocol prefix in a URI
 Watt second (Ws) or Joule, a unit of energy 
 Web service, software system designed to support machine-to-machine interaction over the Web
 Werner syndrome, premature aging
 Williams syndrome, a developmental disorder
 WonderSwan, handheld game console

Sports
 World Sailing, world governing body for the sport of sailing
 The World Series, the annual championship series of Major League Baseball postseason
 World Series (disambiguation)

See also
 The W's, a 1990s Christian swing band
 WS FTP, a File Transfer Protocol client